York St John University (originally established as York Diocesan College), often abbreviated to YSJ, is a public university located on a large urban campus in York, England. Established in 1841, it achieved university status in 2006 and in 2015 the university was given research degree awarding powers for PhD and doctoral programmes.

It is one of several higher education institutions which have religious foundations and is part of the Cathedrals Group of Universities.

In , there were  students, reading a wide variety of subjects, in five schools: School of the Arts; School of Education, Language and Psychology; School of Humanities; School of Science, Technology and Health; and York Business School.

History
The university descends from two Anglican teacher training colleges, which were founded in York in 1841 (for men) and 1846 (for women). York St John University's founding mission was to improve access to education for people from all walks of life. In 1862, the women's college relocated to Ripon. Over the next century, the colleges gradually diversified their education programmes. The colleges, St John's College (named for John the Evangelist) and Ripon College, merged in 1974 to form the "College of Ripon and York St John".

In 1990 the combined institution formally became a college of the University of Leeds; this arrangement allowed it to award degrees in the name of the latter, while remaining in practice largely autonomous. Between 1999 and 2001, all activities were transferred to York and the college received the name "York St John College".

In February 2006, the College was granted the right to award degrees in its own name and the right to call itself a university college. On 10 July 2006 the Privy Council approved a request from the college to become a full-fledged university; the name became "York St John University" on 1 October 2006, and the first Chancellor (installed at a ceremony in York Minster on 7 March 2007) was the Archbishop of York John Sentamu. Archbishop Sentamu retired in 2019 after 12 years as Chancellor. He was succeeded by BBC presenter Reeta Chakrabarti.

Campus

The university has an eleven-acre city centre campus on Lord Mayor's Walk, close to York Minster and the city walls.

Creative Centre 
Opened in 2021, the purpose-built Creative Centre spans three floors and provides teaching space for theatre, drama, creative writing and media production students. A whole floor is dedicated to computer science teaching and research and includes high-tech equipment for software engineering and games development. The Creative Centre also includes a 200-seat theatre for live performances.

Haxby Road Sports Park 

The university's main sports facilities are at the Haxby Road site - one mile from the city centre. The university acquired the site in 2012 and it was named 'York St John University Sports Centre Nestlé Rowntree Park'. A multi-million-pound redevelopment included the creation of a 3G pitch for football and rugby. The facilities at the site also include grass pitches, outdoor tennis courts, sprint track, sports barn and strength and conditioning suites.

In January 2021, three new indoor tennis courts were opened which are available for public use. As part of £1 million investment a 4G pitch matching the specifications of York Community Stadium was built. During the 2021 Rugby League World Cup the sports park hosted the Cook Islands women's team and was the venue for the warm-up match between the York Valkyrie and the Papua New Guinea Orchids on 20 October 2022.

Fountains Learning Centre
The Fountains Learning Centre, opened in 2004, is at the Clarence Street entrance to the campus. It provides access to resources of all kinds including books, journals, DVDs and videos, media equipment, approximately 400 computers and a 200-seat lecture theatre. It also includes a Costa Coffee open to members of the public.

De Grey Court
York St John University's £15.5 million De Grey Court was designed by leading architects Charles Thomson of Rivington Street Studio Architects in London. It has won many plaudits, including the highly lauded Lord Mayor's York Design Award and a Royal Institute of British Architects award.

Gallery

London campus 
In 2018 York St John University's London campus opened, offering 7 postgraduate programmes. The London campus is located near the East India DLR station.

Academic profile

Courses
Around 100 degree course options are available to students at foundation and undergraduate level, including mathematics, data science, biology, biochemistry, nutrition, biomedical science, computer science, film and television production (see filmmaking), media production, physiotherapy, occupational therapy, literature, linguistics, psychology, counselling, business management, marketing, tourism, history, music, music production, art, design, geography, theatre, drama, dance, sport related programmes, theology and primary education.

At postgraduate and post-experience level, York Business School offers a suite of Masters programmes including a new MBA programme.  Other subject areas offered at postgraduate level include theology, education, theatre, fine art, film production, music composition, counselling, health, linguistics and TESOL.

Research
In recent years York St John has developed its research capacity in Allied Health Professions & Studies; Psychology; Education; Sports-related Studies; English Language & Literature; Theology & Religious Studies; and Drama, Dance & Performing Arts. Over 30% of research was ranked as world-leading and internationally excellent in the last Research Excellence Framework (REF) review.

Institute for Social Justice 
The York St John University Institute for Social Justice was launched in 2020 to support the university's mission "to stand up for social justice". The Institute works with people, partners and communities to address the inequalities facing society today.

Reputation and rankings 
York St John University has risen seven places in the Guardian University Guide 2022 to 91st place. In the National Student Survey 2021, the university received an 86% satisfaction score and was ranked 36th of 122 English Higher Education providers. York St John University is in the top 10 UK universities for giving equal access to students from all backgrounds.

Scholarships 
The university has a newly developed set of scholarships for 2021 which include specific scholarships for: students from low income families, students who are from Black, Asian and minority ethnic backgrounds, students who are carers, students whose parents or guardians have died serving their country in the Armed Forces and students who are seeking asylum or with Limited Leave to Remain in the UK.

Students' Union
The YSJ Students' Union (YSJSU), is associated with nearly 50 clubs and societies, covering activities and interests such as sports, languages, music, drama, religion and art. The Students' Union is led by three full-time sabbatical officers: SU President, President of Education and President of Wellbeing and Diversity. There are also a number of part-time officers including chairs of schools and liberation officers. The Students' Union building houses space for students to socialise and create committees.

Community initiatives
In 2021, the Students' Union launched the "Throw it our way" community campaign. In partnership with Mind, Oxfam, RSCPA & the York Community Furniture Store, the campaign aimed to reduce waste being created when students moved out of their accommodation and redistribute items to those in need.

In April 2021, following the easing of some of the Coronavirus pandemic restrictions, the YSJSU launched the campaign "Reconnect the right way." The campaign aimed to normalise social anxiety, support local businesses and give advice on how to stay safe on nights out.

In 2010, the university's Student Union began a programme of action designed to combat antisocial behaviour amongst students.  Private security staff paid by the local council were reported to be on patrol until 3am, 2 evenings a week; Wednesday & Friday, in areas where numbers of complaints had arisen.

In 2005, the Students' Union launched another community-friendly campaign called 'Pick It Up'. This campaign was designed to reduce litter levels on campus and in the surrounding community.

In 2002, a campaign entitled "SSHH – Silent Students Happy Homes" was initiated to combat local residents' fears of studentification. This has subsequently been adopted by other students' unions around the UK, although in many instances the expansion of the abbreviation has been dropped, leaving campaigns called "Shh", "Sshh", or variants .

Awards 
In 2020, the Students' Union received a Silver Award from Investors in People.

In 2017, the YSJSU attained an accreditation through "Quality Students' Unions" - a quality framework run by the National Union of Students.

In June 2014, the Students' Union was short listed for Small and Specialist Students' Union of the Year at the annual NUS Awards.

In 2012 the Students' Union was awarded silver in the Students' Union Evaluation Initiative, making it the only small Students' Union in the country to receive the award.

In October 2009 the Student Union was awarded a Bronze Students' Union Evaluation Initiative award, one of 16 institutions to receive this accolade.  Awards are made from bronze (lowest) to gold (highest).  The scheme is administered by a former manager of Sheffield University Student Union.  Currently Sheffield University shares the gold award with the nearby Leeds University.

Sports
The Students' Union has many sports clubs.

York St John University Rowing Club was founded 11 years after the college in 1852 and caters for all levels of experience; from competent rowers to complete beginners.

As of academic year 2018–19, the biggest club is the dance club, which stands at 119 members, of which 18 compete at a national level. The club offers 10 types of classes (including ballet, jazz and street) to all its members and six to those on the competition team.

The football club plays at Heworth Green: one team competes under the name York St John University in the York Football League (they are currently in the Premier Division of that league system); their reserve team also feature in Reserve Division A, which is the top reserve league. Its origins date back to 1872 when J. Morton persuaded the Sports Association to take up association football.

The cricket club is probably the oldest club – the first record of cricket being played was in 1848, seven years after the opening on the Training College. The club has strong links with its Old Johns Cricket Association, whose president is ex-student Harry Gration.

The hockey club is one of the biggest clubs within the university, offering 1st and 2nd men's and ladies teams and a mixed team. The men's 1st team are the last ever BUSA National Plate champions, having won the competition in 2008.

The badminton club is also present and represents York St John in BUCS too.

As of 2019, students formed an esports society and teams formed in titles such as, Overwatch, League of Legends, and CSGO.

Societies
YSJSU houses around 30 different societies ranging from Musical Production, Drama, Geek Society, and course based societies too such as Physiotherapy, Geography, Primary Education and many more. The societies work together on many projects in the year and all have the opportunity to win the title of Society of year at the annual Societies Awards Dinner.

Democratic structures
As of September 2016, the Students' Union moved to a new democratic structure in order to further student engagement with the Union. The Students' Union is led by a student executive of twelve, including three full-time officer trustees and nine chairs of schools representing each of the university schools. The current president of York St John Students' Union is Tim Holmes. The current president of education is Jenny Marchant. The current president of wellbeing and diversity is Kirsten Jolley.

The executive all hold seats on the Student Council (previously Senate) and the other seats are filled by elected members of each of the six Students' Union 'Zones' (student forums).

Any student can submit a motion to the Student Council on any issue regarding life at university. The motion is then debated by members of Senate and either passed or not passed as policy.

Community links

Public events 
The university regularly hosts in person and virtual lectures, discussions, art displays and presentations for the public to attend.

York St John Communities Centre 
Founded in 2016 and based on the university campus, the Communities Centre offers counselling, support groups and drop-in sessions for local residents. It also conducts research into mental health issues. Specialist areas are bereavement and domestic abuse and the Centre regularly collaborates with Independent Domestic Abuse Services (IDAS).

Notable alumni
 Paul Blomfield, Labour Member of Parliament for Sheffield Central
 Geoff Cooke, former England Rugby International Manager
 Tom Danby, double Rugby Union & League International
 Peter Davies, Professor of Economic History and maritime historian
 Julia Davis, comedy writer and actress best known for writing and starring in the BBC Three sitcom Nighty Night and for her role as Dawn Sutcliffe in popular BBC comedy Gavin & Stacey.
 Harry Gration, television presenter, best known as one of the main presenters for the BBC Yorkshire regional magazine programme Look North
 Alistair Griffin, singer/songwriter who first came to the public's attention on the 2003 BBC television series Fame Academy 2
 Bella Hardy, folk singer
 Jack Harrison, VC MC (1917) and Rugby League player
 Edward Jarvis FRAI, author and theologian
 Matt Messias, ex professional football referee
 Scarlett Moffatt, television personality, famous for Gogglebox, I'm a Celebrity...Get Me Out of Here! and Beauty School Cop Outs
 Peter D. Robinson, presiding Bishop of the United Episcopal Church of North America and Bishop of the Missionary Diocese of the East
 Peter Squires, former England rugby international
 Tim Smith, BBC Radio 2 presenter
 Tom Wilkinson, former professional footballer
Eileen Fenton, first woman to swim the English Channel

See also
 Abi Curtis (poet, writer, and lecturer at York St John University)
 Armorial of UK universities
 College of Education
 List of universities in the UK
 Reeta Chakrabarti (York St John University, chancellor)
 University of York
 York College

References

Further reading
G. P. McGregor (1991) A Church College for the 21st Century? 150 Years of Ripon & York St John, 1841–1991: A Study of Policy and Its Absence. William Sessions Ltd, York, England.

External links

 
 York St John University Students' Union

 
Educational institutions established in 1974
1974 establishments in England
Buildings and structures in York
Culture in York
Universities UK